Kalmiuske or Komsomolske is a city in Kalmiuske Raion, Donetsk Oblast (province) of Ukraine. 

In May 2016, the Verkhovna Rada renamed the town Komsomolske back to its historic name of Kalmiuske under decommunization laws. The Ukrainian government does not control the town, and the new name is not recognized by the separatists and pro-Russian authorities.

History 
Komsomolske has had city status since 1956.

In 1971, the population was 15,800 people, flux limestone was mined here. Also, food industry enterprises and an industrial technical school were here

In January 1989, the population of the city was 14,112 people, the basis of the economy was limestone mining

In 1997, the vocational school No. 68 located in the city was merged with vocational school No. 79.

In January 2013, the population of the city was 11,763 people.

Starting in mid-April 2014, pro-Russian separatists captured several towns in Donetsk Oblast, including Komsomolske. On 29 August 2014, Ukrainian forces reportedly secured the city from the separatists. However, on 31 August, it was recaptured by the separatists.

Transport 
A railway station

Gallery

References

Cities in Donetsk Oblast
Populated places established in the Ukrainian Soviet Socialist Republic
Cities of district significance in Ukraine
City name changes in Ukraine
Kalmiuske Raion